East Rockaway School District is a school district headquartered in East Rockaway, New York. The district was established in 1924. The district is the smallest in Nassau County. In 1992 it had 1,150 students.

At one time the East Rockaway School District proposed paying the Lynbrook Public Schools to have East Rockaway students in grades 7 through 12 attend public schools in Lynbrook; the Lynbrook district rejected the offer. In 1992 Robert Parry, the superintendent of the East Rockaway district, stated that it was still interested in consolidating with another district.

Schools
 East Rockaway High School
 Centre Avenue Elementary School
 Rhame Avenue Elementary School

Controversy
In 2014 a teacher at Rhame Avenue school accused the district of removing her from teaching duties due to her students making higher test scores than expected.

References

External links
 East Rockaway School District

School districts in New York (state)
Education in Nassau County, New York
1924 establishments in New York (state)
Hempstead, New York
School districts established in 1924